Seeing Through Sound is the eighteenth and final studio album by Jon Hassell. It was released on his own record label, Ndeya, on July 24, 2020 and is a companion piece to his previous release Listening to Pictures. It is considered the second volume in his pentimento series.

Track listing

Personnel
Credits adapted from album liner notes.

Musicians
 Jon Hassell – trumpet, keyboard electronics
 Rick Cox – electric guitar, bass clarinet, sample orchestration (1, 3, 4, 5, 6, 7)
 Eivind Aarset – electric guitar, sampler (1)
 John von Seggern – electric bass, synth, keyboard samples (1, 3, 4, 6, 8)
 Kheir-Eddine M'Kachiche – violin, sampler (1)
 Michel Redolfi - electronic textures (2)
 Christoph Harbonnier - Lightwave (2)
 Christian Wittman - Lightwave (2)
 Peter Freeman - bass, electric bass (3, 5)
 Hugh Marsh - violin orchestrations, electric violin and orchestration (4, 8)
 Jan Bang - live sampling (5)
 Sam Minae - rhythmized bass samples, percussion (7)
 Adam Rudolph - African drums and orchestration (8)

Technical personnel
 Jon Hassell – production
 Rick Cox – co-production
 Michel Redolfi – co-production (Moons of Titan)
 Matthew Jones – executive production
 Arnaud Mercier – recording engineer / production consultant
 Al Carlson – mastering
 Dan Kuehn – art direction
 Arien Valizadeh – art direction
 Taska Cleveland – art direction
 Mati Klarwein – album art sources, inspiration

References

External links

 Official link

2020 albums
Jon Hassell albums
Albums with cover art by Mati Klarwein